Henry Oxenden may refer to:

Henry Oxenden (poet) (1609–1670), English poet
Sir Henry Oxenden, 1st Baronet (1614–1686), English politician
Sir Henry Oxenden, 3rd Baronet (1645–1709), deputy-governor of Bombay
Sir Henry Oxenden, 4th Baronet (1690–1720), MP for Sandwich

See also
Oxenden baronets for Sir Henry Oxenden, 6th Baronet, Sir Henry Oxenden, 7th Baronet, Sir Henry Chudleigh Oxenden, 8th Baronet and Sir Henry Montagu Oxenden, 9th Baronet